Walkerthrips is a genus of thrips in the family Phlaeothripidae.

Species
 Walkerthrips neatus

References

Phlaeothripidae
Thrips
Thrips genera